Murder in Soho is a 1939 British crime film directed by Norman Lee and starring Jack La Rue, Sandra Storme, Googie Withers and Bernard Lee. It concerns a murder in the Central London district of Soho. It was released in the U.S. as Murder in the Night.

Cast
 Jack La Rue as Steve Marco 
 Sandra Storme as Ruby Lane 
 Bernard Lee as Roy Barnes 
Martin Walker  as Inspector Hammond 
 James Hayter as Nick Green 
 Googie Withers as Lola Matthews 
 Drue Leyton as Myrtle 
 Arthur O'Connell as Lefty 
 Edmon Ryan as Spike 
 Francis Lister as Joe 
 Alf Goddard as Mike 
 Robert Beatty as Jack 
 Diana Beaumont as Girl 
 Renee Gadd as Woman in Police Station  
 Joss Ambler as Drunk

References

Bibliography
 Wood, Linda. British Films, 1927-1939. British Film Institute, 1986.

External links

1939 films
British crime films
Films shot at Associated British Studios
1930s English-language films
1939 crime films
Films directed by Norman Lee
Films set in London
British black-and-white films
1930s British films